Bar Point is a suburb of the Central Coast region of New South Wales, Australia, located on the north bank of the Hawkesbury River   north of Sydney. It is part of the  local government area.

Geography
Bar Point is bounded by the Hawkesbury River to the west and south, Marlows Gully to the north, and the M1 Pacific Motorway and Pacific Highway to the east, beyond which is the Brisbane Water National Park. The locality is home to the southern section of the Popran National Park, accessible via four-wheel drive from Mount White to the north.

Since 2003, the suburb has been home to a Rural Fire Station.

Demographics
At the ABS , Bar Point had a population of 64 people. The median age was 52, well above the national average of 38, and the median household income was $833 per week.

Heritage listings
Bar Point has a number of heritage-listed sites, including:
 Cascade Gully, Hawkesbury River: HMAS Parramatta Shipwreck and Memorials

References

Further reading
 
 

Suburbs of the Central Coast (New South Wales)
Hawkesbury River